Hitchhike! is a 1974 American TV film directed by Gordon Hessler.

Plot
A Los Angeles woman, traveling to San Francisco to visit her sister, picks up a hitchhiker who turns out to be a psychotic killer.

Cast
Cloris Leachman
Michael Brandon
Henry Darrow

Production
Leachman said she did it because it was work, "I like a change of pace" and "there are so many things you can do if the character is right."

Reception
The Los Angeles Times called it "a trite suspenser given dimension by Cloris Leachman."

References

External links

1974 television films
1974 films
Films directed by Gordon Hessler
American television films
American thriller films
1970s English-language films
1970s American films